Kućice, which translates as Cottages from Serbo-Croatian,  may refer to:

 Kućice (Hadžići), a village in Hadžići municipality, Bosnia and Herzegovina
 Kućice, Zavidovići, a village in Zavidovići municipality, Bosnia and Herzegovina